Selfors Church is a rented chapel of the Church of Norway in Rana Municipality in Nordland county, Norway.  It is located in the village of Selfors. It is an annex chapel for the Nord-Rana parish which is part of the Indre Helgeland prosti (deanery) in the Diocese of Sør-Hålogaland. The concrete, wood, and glass church was built in 1971 for the Catholic Church in Rana and has been leased by the Nord-Rana parish since 1976. The church seats about 200 people.

Media gallery

See also
List of churches in Sør-Hålogaland

References

Rana, Norway
Churches in Nordland
Wooden churches in Norway
20th-century Church of Norway church buildings
Churches completed in 1971
1976 establishments in Norway